The Fellowship of Christian Councils and Churches in the Great Lakes and Horn of Africa (FECCLAHA, also Fraternité Des Eglises et Des Conseils Chrétiens Des Grands Lacs et De La Corne De L'Afrique) is an ecumenical Christian organization in Africa. It was founded in 1999 and is a member of the World Council of Churches. Its membership includes:

 Christian Council of Tanzania
 Church of Christ in Congo
 Eritrean Orthodox Tewahedo Church
 Ethiopian Evangelical Church Mekane Yesus
 Evangelical Church of Eritrea
 National Council of Churches of Burundi
 National Council of Churches of Kenya
 New Sudan Council of Churches
 Protestant Council of Rwanda
 Sudan Council of Churches
 Uganda Joint Christian Council

External links  
Official website
World Council of Churches listing

Christian organizations established in 1999
Members of the World Council of Churches
Christian organizations based in Africa
Regional councils of churches